Stetten is a municipality in the district of Unterallgäu in Bavaria, Germany. The town has a municipal association with Dirlewang.

It is located in Upper Swabia.

Transportation 

Stetten is served by the Buchloe-Memmingen railway.

References

Unterallgäu